The left triangular ligament is a large peritoneal fold. It connects the posterior part of the upper surface of the left lobe of the liver to the thoracic diaphragm.

Structure 
The left triangular ligament connects the posterior part of the upper surface of the left lobe of the liver to the thoracic diaphragm. Its anterior layer is continuous with the left layer of the falciform ligament.

Additional images

References

External links
 
  - "Stomach, Spleen and Liver: Ligaments of the Liver"
 

Ligaments of the torso
Liver anatomy